Coral Springs Christian Academy (CSCA) was a private Christian school in Coral Springs, Florida serving students in pre-school through 12th grade.

The school was a ministry of First Presbyterian Church of Coral Springs, until the school was sold because of damages caused by Hurricane Irma.  Also known as CSCA, the school opened in 1971 as an elementary and middle school called "Coral Springs Christian School."

CSCA was accredited by the Southern Association of Colleges and Schools (SACS), Association of Christian Schools International (ACSI), and the Florida Council of Independent Schools (FCIS).

References

External links
 
 

Christian schools in Florida
Private high schools in Florida
Private elementary schools in Florida
Private middle schools in Florida
High schools in Broward County, Florida
Schools in Broward County, Florida
Buildings and structures in Coral Springs, Florida
Presbyterian schools in the United States
1970 establishments in Florida
Educational institutions established in 1970
2018 disestablishments in Florida
Educational institutions disestablished in 2018